Marc Capdevila Pons (born May 12, 1974) is a former breaststroke swimmer from Spain.

He was born in Vic, Catalonia, and competed for his native country at the 1996 Summer Olympics in Atlanta, Georgia. There he finished in 15th position in the 100m Breaststroke.

References
 Spanish Olympic Committee

1974 births
Living people
Spanish male breaststroke swimmers
Olympic swimmers of Spain
Swimmers at the 1996 Summer Olympics
Sportspeople from Vic
20th-century Spanish people